Holiday Rambler Corporation is an American corporation which primarily manufactures recreational vehicles. It was founded in 1953. In 1961, Holiday Rambler’s introduction of aluminum body framing ushered in a new era of lighter, stronger and more durable recreational vehicles (RVs). This aluminum frame (Alumaframe) became the standard for lighter and stronger RVs for 40 years. Holiday Rambler was also responsible for many firsts; built-in refrigerators, holding tanks and aerodynamic radiused corners. As Holiday Rambler moved into motorhomes, they were the first with tag axles and the kitchen slide-out revolutionized "interior engineering" in the field. Holiday Rambler was sold to Harley-Davidson in 1986 and later in 1996 to the Monaco Coach Corporation where its future, then under Navistar International Corp., was difficult in 2010 as it was for most motorhome manufacturers.

In May 2013, Holiday Rambler was sold by Navistar International Corp. to Allied Specialty Vehicles.

History
Company founder Richard Klingler started building trailer parts in a chicken coop and assembling the trailers outdoors in the 1950s in Wakarusa, Indiana. The Elkhart and Wakarusa ( south of Elkhart) area of Indiana became the recreational vehicle (then called "campers") capital of the US after World War II. The first Holiday Rambler recreational vehicle was a travel trailer introduced to the public in 1953 by the Klingler Corporation. A fully restored example is in the RV museum in Elkhart, Indiana. There is a watercolor painting of it by artist Paige Bridges.

Holiday Rambler Corporation and its subsidiaries ("Holiday Rambler") was acquired by the Harley-Davidson, Inc. in December 1986. Holiday Rambler's Recreational Vehicle division competed primarily in the mid to premium segment of the recreational vehicle market.

On March 4, 1996, the Monaco Coach Corporation of Oregon acquired from Harley-Davidson, Inc. certain assets of Holiday Rambler (the "Holiday Acquisition") in exchange for $21.5 million in cash, 65,217 shares of Redeemable Preferred Stock (which was subsequently converted into 230,767 shares of Common Stock), and the assumption of most of the liabilities of Holiday Rambler. Concurrently, the Company acquired ten Holiday World Dealerships for $13.0 million, including a $12.0 million subordinated.

On June 23, 2009, Judge Kevin Carey agreed to the Monaco Coach Corporation's request to convert its Chapter 11 bankruptcy filing to a Chapter 7 case so it could liquidate its remaining assets. The order converting the case to Chapter 7 was effective June 30. Monaco Coach Corporation sold its factories, inventory, brands and intellectual property to Navistar International Corp. earlier in June for $47 million. Once the remaining assets were liquidated under Chapter 7, "the entity ceases to exist," and effectively spelled the end of Monaco Coach Corporation.

Models
Holiday Rambler manufactures motorhomes, which travel on their own power, and towables, which are designed to be pulled by a motor vehicle. All of these recreational vehicles have toilets and facilities for cooking and sleeping.

Motorhomes can be quite large and expensive. The Navigator prices start at $495,000 USD Manufacturer's Suggested Retail Price (MSRP).  The Navigator is a Class A motorhome.

Class A Motorhomes
Traveler
Navigator
Imperial Holliday rambler 5th wheel
Scepter
Endeavor
Ambassador
Neptune
Vacationer
Admiral
Arista
Aluma-Lite
Trip
Limited
Invicta
Armada

A Class A motor home has a large frame similar to that of a bus, but is built on its own specialized chassis. When fully loaded, these vehicles can weigh as much as 50,000 pounds.

Class B Motorhomes
Augusta B+

A Class B motorhome is usually built on a cargo van chassis. When fully loaded, these vehicles can weigh as much as 20,000 pounds.

Class C Motorhomes

Atlantis
Aluma-Lite
Presidential
Traveler 24 (Built on Mercedes Sprinter chassis with 3l diesel engine)
A Class C motorhome is usually built on a truck chassis. When fully loaded, these vehicles can weigh as much as 14,000 pounds.

Fifth Wheel
Presidential Suite
Presidential
Imperial
Alumascape Suite
Aluma-Lite
Alumascape
Next Level
Savoy LX FW
Savoy LE FW

Fifth Wheel towables are trailers that are designed to connect to the towing vehicle between the front and rear axles. Usually these are towed by pickup trucks and the fifth wheel receiver is placed in the bed of the truck. When fully loaded, these vehicles can weigh as much as 17,000 pounds.

Bumper Pull Travel Trailer
Savoy LX TT
Savoy LE TT
Mintaro
Black Diamond
Campmaster
Aluma-Lite
Alumascape
Presidential
Rambler
Traveler
Statesman
Monitor
Bumper Pull towables are designed to attach to the towing vehicle behind the rear axle on the bumper or on a receiver that is attached to the frame. When fully loaded, these vehicles can weigh as much as 10,000 pounds. These towables start at $20,000 USD Manufacturer's Suggested Retail Price (MSRP).

See also
 List of companies based in Oregon
 REV Group

References

External links
 Holiday Rambler official site

Recreational vehicle manufacturers
Navistar International
Vehicle manufacturing companies established in 1953
Companies that filed for Chapter 11 bankruptcy in 2009
Companies that have filed for Chapter 7 bankruptcy
Companies based in Oregon
1953 establishments in Indiana
Manufacturing companies based in Oregon